The men's 25 metre rapid fire pistol event at the 2018 Asian Games in Palembang, Indonesia took place on 24 and 25 August at the Jakabaring International Shooting Range.

Schedule
All times are Western Indonesia Time (UTC+07:00)

Records

Results

Qualification

Final

References

External links
 Shooting 25m Rapid Fire Pistol Men
 Results at asia-shooting.org

Men's 25 metre rapid fire pistol